Anomala cavifrons is a species of shining leaf chafer in the family of beetles known as Scarabaeidae.

References

Further reading

 

Rutelinae
Articles created by Qbugbot
Beetles described in 1867